Nadezhda Karpukhina (born 21 July 1949) is a Soviet diver. She competed in the women's 10 metre platform event at the 1968 Summer Olympics.

References

1949 births
Living people
Soviet female divers
Olympic divers of the Soviet Union
Divers at the 1968 Summer Olympics
Sportspeople from Baku